Goniusa is a genus of rove beetles in the family Staphylinidae. There are at least three described species in Goniusa.

Species
These three species belong to the genus Goniusa:
 Goniusa alperti Kistner, 1976
 Goniusa carrorum Maruyama & Klimaszewski, 2004
 Goniusa caseyi Gusarov, 2003

References

Further reading

 
 
 
 
 
 

Aleocharinae
Articles created by Qbugbot